Royal Botanic Gardens, Kew is a non-departmental public body in the United Kingdom sponsored by the Department for Environment, Food and Rural Affairs. An internationally important botanical research and education institution, it employs 1,100 staff. Its board of trustees is chaired by Dame Amelia Fawcett.

The organisation manages botanic gardens at Kew in Richmond upon Thames in south-west London, and at Wakehurst, a National Trust property in Sussex which is home to the internationally important Millennium Seed Bank, whose scientists work with partner organisations in more than 95 countries. Kew, jointly with the Forestry Commission, founded Bedgebury National Pinetum in Kent in 1923, specialising in growing conifers. In 1994, the Castle Howard Arboretum Trust, which runs the Yorkshire Arboretum, was formed as a partnership between Kew and the Castle Howard Estate.

In 2019, the organisation had 2,316,699 public visitors at Kew, and 312,813 at Wakehurst. Its  site at Kew has 40 historically important buildings; it became a UNESCO World Heritage Site in 2003. The collections at Kew and Wakehurst include over 27,000 taxa of living plants, 8.3 million plant and fungal herbarium specimens, and over 40,000 species in the seed bank.

Mission 
The Royal Botanic Gardens, Kew states that its mission is to apply scientific discovery and research to fully develop the information about and potential uses of plants and fungi.

A conference held in 1976 by the Royal Botanic Gardens Kew was important as it established a co-ordinating body in order to determine which threatened plants are in cultivation and where they are located which played a role in plant conservation.

Governance 
Kew is governed by a board of trustees which comprises a chairman and eleven members. Ten members and the chairman are appointed by the Secretary of State for Environment, Food and Rural Affairs. His Majesty the King appoints his own trustee on the recommendation of the Secretary of State.  the Board members are:
 Dame Amelia Fawcett (Chair)
 Judith Batchelar
 Steve Almond
 Sarah Flannigan
 Professor Christopher Gilligan
 Professor Ian Graham
Krishnan Guru-Murthy
 Kate Priestman
 Sir Paul Nurse
 David Richardson
 John Scanlon
 Jantiene Klein Roseboom van der Veer

Kew Science

Scientific staff 

There are approximately 350 researchers working at Kew. The Director of Science is Alexandre Antonelli. The Deputy Directors are Paul Kersey and Monique Simmonds.

Kew Science staff include those of the Kew Madagascar Conservation Centre.

Databases 
The scientific staff at Kew maintain a variety of plant and fungal data and digital resources, including:

Plants of the World Online 

Plants of the World Online is an online database launched in March 2017 as one of nine strategic outputs with the ultimate aim being "to enable users to access information on all the world's known seed-bearing plants by 2020". It links taxonomic data with images from the collection, to provide a single point of access with information on identification, distribution, traits, conservation, molecular phylogenies and uses. In addition it serves as a backbone for global resources such as World Flora Online.

International Plant Names Index

The International Plant Names Index (IPNI) includes information from the Index Kewensis, a project which began in the 19th century to provide an "Index to the Names and Authorities of all known flowering plants and their countries". The Harvard University Herbaria and the Australian National Herbarium co-operate with Kew in the IPNI database, which was launched in its present form in 1999 to produce an authoritative source of information on botanical nomenclature including publication details of seed plants, ferns and lycophytes. It is a nomenclatural listing of all published taxonomic plant names including new species, new combinations and new names at rank of botanical family down to infraspecific. It provides data for other related projects including Tropicos and the Global Biodiversity Information Facility (GBIF).

Neotropikey 

Information and key to flowering plants of the Neotropics (tropical South and Central America).

World Checklist of Selected Plant Families 

The World Checklist of Selected Plant Families (WCSP) is a register of accepted scientific names and synonyms of 200 selected seed plant families. WCSP is widely used, and most authoritative web resources on plants use it as their basis.

World Checklist of Vascular Plants 

The World Checklist of Vascular Plants (WCVP) includes all known vascular plant species (flowering plants, conifers, ferns, clubmosses, and firmosses). It is derived from the WCSP and the IPNI and therefore only includes names found in those databases. It is the taxonomic database for Plants of the World Online. Since WCSP includes only selected families, WCVP will seek to complete the process.

World Checklist of Useful Plant Species 

A checklist of 40,292 species, including nine non-plant taxa (e.g. nostoc, forkweed, brown algae), compiled from multiple pre-existing datasets.

Collaborative projects

The Plant List 

Kew also cooperated with the Missouri Botanical Garden and other international bodies in The Plant List (TPL). Unlike the IPNI, it provides information on which names are currently accepted. The Plant List is an Internet encyclopedia project which was launched in 2010 to compile a comprehensive list of botanical nomenclature. The Plant List has 1,064,035 scientific plant names of species rank of which 350,699 are accepted species names. In addition, the list has 642 plant families and 17,020 plant genera. It was last updated in 2013, and was superseded by World Flora Online.

World Flora Online 

World Flora Online was developed as a successor to The Plant List, in 2012, aiming to include all known plants by 2020.

See also

 Royal Botanic Gardens, Kew – its two main sites: 
Kew Gardens
 Wakehurst, West Sussex
 Botanists active at Kew Gardens
Curtis's Botanical Magazine, an illustrated publication which began in 1787 and is published by Wiley-Blackwell for the Royal Botanic Gardens, Kew
 Directors of the Royal Botanic Gardens, Kew
 GrassBase
 Index Kewensis, a massive index of plant names started and maintained by Kew Gardens
 Joseph Dalton Hooker, who succeeded his father, William Jackson Hooker, as director in 1865
 Kew Bulletin, a peer-reviewed scientific journal published by Springer Science+Business Media on behalf of the Royal Botanic Gardens, Kew
 The Great Plant Hunt, a primary school science initiative created by Kew Gardens, commissioned and funded by the Wellcome Trust
Kew Gardens (Leases) Act 2019, an Act of Parliament relating to  the Gardens

References

Sources

External links

 A Year at Kew – BBC documentary behind the scenes at Kew Gardens (archived 13 February 2005)

 
1759 establishments in England
Botanical research institutes
Charities based in London
Department for Environment, Food and Rural Affairs
Exempt charities
Kew, London
Non-departmental public bodies of the United Kingdom government
Organisations based in the London Borough of Richmond upon Thames
Herbaria in the United Kingdom